The 2012 Molson Canadian Men's Provincial Curling Championship was held from February 1 to 5 at the Thistle St. Andrew Curling Club in Saint John, New Brunswick. The winning team of Terry Odishaw, will represent New Brunswick at the 2012 Tim Hortons Brier in Saskatoon, Saskatchewan.

Teams

Standings

Results

Draw 1
February 1, 14:00

Draw 2
February 1, 19:00

Draw 3
February 2, 14:00

Draw 4
February 2, 19:00

Draw 5
February 3, 2:00 PM

Draw 6
February 3, 7:00 PM

Draw 7
February 4, 9:00 AM

Tiebreakers
February 4, 2:30 PM

Playoffs

Semifinal
February 4, 8:00 PM

Final
February 5, 2:30 PM

References

External links
Results site

Molson Canadian Men's Provincial Curling Championship
Molson Canadian Men's Provincial Curling Championship